Pleasant Township is one of twenty-one townships in LaPorte County, Indiana. As of the 2010 census, its population was 3,380 and it contained 1,427 housing units.

History
Pleasant Township was established in 1834, and named from its scenic landscapes.

Geography

References

External links
 Indiana Township Association
 United Township Association of Indiana

Townships in LaPorte County, Indiana
Townships in Indiana